

Honours

Manager 
Coupe de France

References 

Living people
1947 births
Iranian footballers
Iranian football managers
Association footballers not categorized by position
Sanat Naft Abadan F.C. managers
American expatriate soccer coaches